Maes or Maës is a Dutch & Spanish (Maes/e) patronymic surname. It is the third most common surname in Belgium (25,683 people). Notable people with the surname include:

Maes
 Andreas Maes (1514-1573), Flemish priest, humanist and student of Syriac
 Brian Maes (born 1956), American musician
 Camillus Paul Maes (1846-1915), Belgian-born bishop in the United States
 Caroline Maes (born 1982), Belgian tennis player
 Femke Maes (born 1982), Belgian footballer
 Friedrich-Wilhelm Maes (1913-1945), German military commander
 Gino Maes (born 1957), Belgian footballer
 Godfried Maes (1649 – 1700), Flemish painter
 Hermine Maes, Belgian behavior geneticist
 Isaak Maes (born 2001), American musician
 Jef Maes (1905–1996), Belgian composer and violinist 
 Jules Maes (1882-?), Belgian fencer
 Kristof Maes (born 1988), Belgian football goalkeeper
 Lieve Maes (born 1960), Belgian politician
 Louis Maes (born 1913), Belgian canoer
 Natacha Maes (born 1964), Belgian racing cyclist
 Nelly Maes (born 1941), Belgian politician
 Nicolaes Maes (1634–1693), Dutch Baroque painter
 Nikolas Maes (born 1986), Belgian racing cyclist
 Pattie Maes (born 1961), Media Arts professor at MIT
 Peter Maes (born 1964), Belgian footballer
 Romain Maes (1913–1983), Belgian cyclist, winner of Tour de France 1935
 Sven Maes (born 1973), Belgian DJ and trance music producer
 Sylvère Maes (1909–1966), Belgian cyclist, winner of Tour de France 1936 and 1939
 Virginia Orr Maes (1920–1986), American malacologist

Maës
Eugène Maës (1890–1945), French footballer
Tove Maës (1921–2010), Danish actress of stage, television and film

Others
Maes is also a Welsh or Brythonic toponymic name referring to one who lived or worked “in or near a field”.  In this usage it is pronounced “Mize”, and is a possible etymological source of that name as well.

See also
 Maas (surname)
 Maëlys, French feminine name of Breton origin

Surnames of Belgian origin
Dutch-language surnames
Patronymic surnames